Aaron Telitz (born December 13, 1991) is an American race car driver. He currently competes full-time in the WeatherTech SportsCar Championship, driving for AIM Vasser Sullivan.

Career
Born in Birchwood, Wisconsin, Telitz began his racing career in karting in 1998. He remained in karting until 2012. In 2014, Telitz moved into open-wheel racing, competing in the U.S. F2000 National Championship with ArmsUp Motorsports. He claimed a win and six podiums in 14 races, ending fourth in the season standings. Telitz returned to the series in 2015, moving to Cape Motorsports with Wayne Taylor Racing. He got a win and 11 podiums in 16 races, finishing third in the final classification.

In 2016, Telitz moved up the Road to Indy ladder, graduating into the Pro Mazda Championship with Team Pelfrey. He collected six wins and six second place finishes in 16 races, claiming the championship over teammate Patricio O'Ward.

Belardi Auto Racing signed Telitz for the 2017 Indy Lights season, and he scored a second-place finish in the Freedom 100. He stayed with the team for the following year. Also during 2018, Telitz tested an IndyCar for Schmidt Peterson Motorsports.

After not finding enough funding to remain in open-wheel racing for 2019, Telitz was contacted by Jimmy Vasser in late 2018 to compete for his WeatherTech SportsCar Championship team for the four endurance championship events, starting with the 2019 24 Hours of Daytona with co-drivers Townsend Bell, Frankie Montecalvo and Jeff Segal. As part of the deal, Telitz would accompany Vasser's IMSA and IndyCar teams to all other events in hopes of moving to the IndyCar operation. He started off the season with a second place at Daytona.

Telitz still found his way into open-wheel racing during 2019; however, as he signed with Belardi for the Freedom 100, which was derailed with a broken half shaft. A month later, he returned to Belardi for his home event at Road America. His schedule expanded as the season went on, eventually winning a Lights contest in Toronto.

For 2020, Telitz initially re-upped with AVS Vasser Sullivan for four WTSCC endurance events. That schedule was expanded to a full-time ride in June when original full-time driver Parker Chase found that the reconfigured schedule would clash with his educational pursuits.

Personal life
Telitz is a painter and during his 2018 season sold paintings to pay for crash damage.
On November 22nd, 2021, Aaron's wife Maggie gave birth to a son.

Racing record

Career summary

* Season still in progress.

American open-wheel racing results

U.S. F2000 National Championship

Pro Mazda Championship

Indy Lights

Complete IMSA SportsCar Championship results

† Points only counted towards the WeatherTech Sprint Cup and not the overall GTD Championship.

References

External links
 
 

1991 births
Living people
Racing drivers from Wisconsin
U.S. F2000 National Championship drivers
Indy Pro 2000 Championship drivers
Indy Lights drivers
People from Rice Lake, Wisconsin
24 Hours of Daytona drivers
WeatherTech SportsCar Championship drivers
Belardi Auto Racing drivers
Wayne Taylor Racing drivers
Team Pelfrey drivers
Michelin Pilot Challenge drivers